The Girls of FHM was a novelty pop act, manufactured by FHM magazine.  They  recorded and released a cover version of Rod Stewart's "Da Ya Think I'm Sexy?" on 21 June 2004, which undertook a dance remix. It hit number 10 in the UK Singles Chart on 3 July 2004. Profits were donated to Breakthrough Breast Cancer.

The video featured Naomi Campbell, Lisa Scott-Lee from Steps, Myleene Klass from Hear'Say, Jessica Taylor, Kelli Young and Michelle Heaton from Liberty X, Liz McClarnon from Atomic Kitten, Hannah Spearritt and Tina Barrett from S Club 7, Jakki Degg, Jodie Marsh and Michelle Marsh joined them, along with Big Brother 's Nush, Lady Isabella Hervey and Sophie Anderton. Nikki Sanderson and Samia Ghadie from Coronation Street were included; FHM 's 'High Street Honeys' also put in an appearance.

Video

The video is set in a bar at a fashion show, and was considered by the music industry to be a spoof of the fashion world. The video was filmed in Edgware, North London, and was directed by Phil Griffin.

Lead and backing vocals were provided by session singer Sue Quin, also known for being the voice of Eyeopener (All Around the World Records). She has sung on numerous dance records for AATW including tracks for Bus Stop, Flip and Fill and DJ Milano.
The vocals were recorded at AATW studios in Blackburn.

In 2007, a second video was released of a cover version of the Divinyls song "I Touch Myself".

Discography

Singles

References

External links
 

British pop music groups
British pop girl groups
Charity supergroups
British supergroups